Marquess Wu or variants may refer to:

Zhou dynasty
Marquis Wu of Jin ( 10th or 9th century BC), third ruler of the state of Jin
Marquis Wu of Cai (died 837 BC), sixth ruler of the State of Cai
Marquess Lie of Han (died 387 BC), also known as Marquess Wu of Han, a ruler of the State of Han
Marquess Wu of Wei (died 370 BC), a ruler of the State of Wei

Three Kingdoms period China
Sun Ce (175–200), late Han dynasty warlord, formally Marquess of Wu
Sun Quan (182–252), founder of Eastern Wu, Sun Ce's brother, one-time Marquis of Wu, later Emperor Da of Wu
Zhuge Liang (181–234), Shu Han politician, Marquis of Wu District

See also
Duke Wu (disambiguation)
King Wu (disambiguation)
Empress Wu (disambiguation)